The island of Borneo, located in southeast Asia at the southern edge of the South China Sea, is home to one endemic bird family, three endemic bird genera and 59 endemic bird species. All but one of the latter are forest dwellers, with most restricted to the spine of hills and mountains running down the middle of the island. The avian endemism has been shaped by the island's geological history. Borneo sits on a continental shelf. During glacial periods, when water levels were lower, Borneo was linked with other islands on the shelf and with the Malay peninsula in a large landmass known as Sundaland. This allowed bird species to move freely throughout the region until the waters rose again as the glaciers melted. Separated from their relatives by the sea, some of these species evolved over millennia into the endemics now found on the island. BirdLife International has designated the mountainous central spine of the island as an Endemic Bird Area (EBA) because of the number of endemic species found there, and has further designated several lowland regions and nearby islands as secondary EBAs. Habitat destruction is a major threat to Borneo's endemic birds, as forests are lost to palm oil plantations and timber harvesting.

Geology and geological history
Borneo is an island located in southeast Asia, on the continental shelf at the southern edge of the South China Sea. It lies south of the Philippines, west of Sulawesi, north of Java, and east of peninsular Malaysia. However, a spine of mountains runs down much of the central portion of the island. The island is shared by three countries: Indonesia, Malaysia, and Brunei. While the lowlands are the most productive habitat in terms of the number of bird species found there, the mountains are the seat of Borneo's endemism. This is in large part due to the island's geological history.

During the Pleistocene, the world's polar caps repeatedly advanced and retreated, alternately locking vast amounts of water into ice, and releasing it back into the world's oceans. This caused the water level in the oceans to repeatedly rise and fall. During glacial periods, when water levels were at their lowest, much of the Sunda Shelf was exposed. This linked what are now discrete islands (including Borneo, Java, Sumatra, and a host of smaller islands) with the Malay peninsula in one large landmass known as Sundaland. During periods when the shelf was exposed, birds could move freely across the whole landmass. When the waters rose again, these birds were cut off from their relatives, and evolved in isolation on the various islands. Temperatures were cooler overall during glacial periods, so montane birds (those generally restricted to the slopes of mountains) could move lower and spread across larger areas. During interglacial periods, they retreated to higher elevations and were separated again from other populations, including birds in the lowlands. Studies have shown that some endemic montane species are most closely related to species in Borneo's lowlands, while others are more closely related to montane species on other Sundaland islands.

Endemism and threats
The island is home to a single endemic family: Pityriaseidae, which contains a single endemic genus (Pityriasis) with a single endemic species, the Bornean bristlehead. In addition, the island holds two other endemic genera, both of which are also monotypic: Chlamydochaera (the fruithunter) and Haematortyx (the crimson-headed partridge). Two other monotypic genera formerly considered to be endemic to the island—Chlorocharis and Oculocincta—have since been merged into more widespread genera. Chlorocharis was merged into the large white-eye genus Zosterops after molecular studies showed it nested comfortably within that genus. The same studies showed that Oculocincta was embedded within the smaller white-eye genus Heleia, leading it to be moved as well.

There are 59 endemic bird species on Borneo, according to the taxonomy proposed by the International Ornithologists' Union. Nearly all of these are forest birds; only the dusky munia is not. In all, roughly 10% of Borneo's forest birds are endemic to the island. Of these, 60% are montane species, 30% are found on lower slopes, and 10% are lowland species. However, Borneo's forests are under threat, particularly in the lowlands. Nearly 40% of the island's forests had been completely cleared by 2016, and another 34% had been selectively logged. Some 80% of Kalimantan's forests have been sold to timber concessions. Much of the original lowland forest has been converted to palm oil plantations; these now cover more than 32% of Kalimantan's lowland area. This results in a huge loss of biodiversity. While the original dipterocarp forests are home to more than 220 bird species, for example, palm plantations support only about 14 resident species. Some 80% of Kalimantan's forests have been opened up to timber concessions, even in protected areas. Many highland forests fall into protected areas—including national parks and forest reserves—but such gazetting does not always guarantee true protection, with logging occurring even in those areas.

Endemic Bird Areas

Birdlife International defines Endemic Bird Areas (EBAs) as places where the breeding ranges of two or more range-restricted species—those with breeding ranges of less than —overlap. In order to qualify, the whole of the breeding range of at least two range-restricted species must fall entirely within the EBA. Borneo has one such area. The Bornean mountains EBA (157) comprises  of mountain ranges in Borneo's interior, at an altitude above  in elevation. These mountains are found in all three countries which share the island. Two of Borneo's three endemic genera are found here; only the Borneo bristlehead is found at lower elevations. In total, 31 range-restricted species occur within this EBA.

BirdLife International has also designated five Secondary EBAs for Borneo: two smaller island groups and three areas on Borneo itself. Secondary EBAs are those which either include the breeding range of only a single range-restricted species, or those which cover only part of a range-restricted bird's breeding area.

 The North-east Bornean islands secondary area (s097) includes a number of small islands off the northern and eastern coasts of Borneo. The grey imperial pigeon, which the International Union for Conservation of Nature (IUCN) considers to be a vulnerable species, is found on a dozen or so of the islands; the near threatened, range-restricted Mantanani scops owl is more common and widespread on the small islands off Sabah. Both species also breed on small islands near the Philippines. Three designated Important Bird Areas (IBAs) fall within this area.

 The Sabah lowlands secondary area (s098) encompasses the lowlands of the Malaysian state of Sabah, at the northern end of Borneo. The breeding range of the white-fronted falconet, a near-threatened species, falls entirely within the area. Part of the breeding range of the white-crowned shama is also included. The secondary area includes eight designated IBAs.

 The Kalimantan lowlands secondary area (s099) encompasses the lowland forest thought to contain the breeding range of the black-browed babbler, a presumably threatened species recently rediscovered, more than 170 years after the only specimen was collected. There are no IBAs in this secondary area.

 The Bornean coastal zone secondary area (s100) includes mangroves, coastal forest, and scrub on the island's western and southern coasts. These lie in the Malaysian state of Sarawak, and the Indonesian provinces of Kalimantan Barat, Kalimantan Selatan and Kalimantan Tengah. Part of the breeding area of the range-restricted Javan white-eye is found here; the vulnerable species also breeds on the Javan coast. The secondary area includes one designated IBA.

 The Natuna Islands secondary area (s101) includes small islands in an archipelago located off the western coast of Borneo. The critically endangered and range-restricted silvery pigeon occurs in very small numbers here; it also occurs on Sumatra and a few smaller islands just off Sumatra's coasts. One designated IBA lies within this zone.

List of endemic species

See also
 Deforestation in Borneo

Notes

Citations

References

 
 
 
 
 
 
 
 
 
 
 
 
 
 
 
 
 

 
 
 
 
 
 
 
 
 
 
 
 

Borneo
'